= Sangbad Lahari =

Indian newspaper

Sangbad Lahari (Bengali: সংবাদ লহরী) was a Bengali daily newspaper published from Guwahati, Assam, India. Sangbad Lahari was launched in 2009 in Guwahati and later its Meghalaya edition was started in July, 2011. It was Meghalaya's first Bengali newspaper. The owner of the newspaper was Shillong Times Pvt Ltd, Meghalaya.

Management has decided to close down the publication of Sangbad Lahari from 1 April 2014.
